Standard temperature and pressure (STP) are standard sets of conditions for experimental measurements to be established to allow comparisons to be made between different sets of data. The most used standards are those of the International Union of Pure and Applied Chemistry (IUPAC) and the National Institute of Standards and Technology (NIST), although these are not universally accepted standards. Other organizations have established a variety of alternative definitions for their standard reference conditions.

In chemistry, IUPAC changed its definition of standard temperature and pressure in 1982: 
 Until 1982, STP was defined as a temperature of 273.15 K (0 °C, 32 °F) and an absolute pressure of exactly 1 atm (101.325 kPa). 
 Since 1982, STP has been defined as a temperature of 273.15 K (0 °C, 32 °F) and an absolute pressure of exactly 105 Pa (100 kPa, 1 bar).

STP should not be confused with the standard state commonly used in thermodynamic evaluations of the Gibbs energy of a reaction.

NIST uses a temperature of 20 °C (293.15 K, 68 °F) and an absolute pressure of 1 atm (14.696 psi, 101.325 kPa). This standard is also called normal temperature and pressure (abbreviated as NTP). However, a common temperature and pressure in use by NIST for thermodynamic experiments is 298.15 K (25°C, 77°F) and 1 bar (14.5038 psi, 100 kPa).  NIST also uses "15 °C (60 °F)"  for the temperature compensation of refined petroleum products, despite noting that these two values are not exactly consistent with each other.

In industry and commerce, standard conditions for temperature and pressure are often necessary to define the standard reference conditions to express the volumes of gases and liquids and related quantities such as the rate of volumetric flow (the volumes of gases vary significantly with temperature and pressure): standard cubic meters per second (Sm3/s), and normal cubic meters per second (Nm3/s).

However, many technical publications (books, journals, advertisements for equipment and machinery) simply state "standard conditions" without specifying them; often substituting the term with older "normal conditions", or "NC". In special cases this can lead to confusion and errors. Good practice always incorporates the reference conditions of temperature and pressure. If not stated, some room environment conditions are supposed, close to 1 atm pressure,  293 K (20 °C), and 0% humidity.

Definitions

Past uses
The above definitions are no longer the most commonly used in either system of units.

Current use

Many different definitions of standard reference conditions are currently being used by organizations all over the world. The table below lists a few of them, but there are more. Some of these organizations used other standards in the past. For example, IUPAC has, since 1982, defined standard reference conditions as being 0 °C and 100 kPa (1 bar), in contrast to its old standard of 0 °C and 101.325 kPa (1 atm). The new value is the mean atmospheric pressure at an altitude of about 112 metres, which is closer to the worldwide median altitude of human habitation (194 m).

Natural gas companies in Europe, Australia, and South America have adopted 15 °C (59 °F) and 101.325 kPa (14.696 psi) as their standard gas volume reference conditions, used as the base values for defining the standard cubic meter. Also, the International Organization for Standardization (ISO), the United States Environmental Protection Agency (EPA) and National Institute of Standards and Technology (NIST) each have more than one definition of standard reference conditions in their various standards and regulations.

Abbreviations:
 EGIA: Electricity and Gas Inspection Act (of Canada)
 SATP: Standard Ambient Temperature and Pressure
 SCF: Standard Cubic Foot

International Standard Atmosphere
In aeronautics and fluid dynamics the "International Standard Atmosphere" (ISA) is a specification of pressure, temperature, density, and speed of sound at each altitude. The International Standard Atmosphere is representative of atmospheric conditions at mid latitudes. In the USA this information is specified the U.S. Standard Atmosphere which is identical to the "International Standard Atmosphere" at all altitudes up to 65,000 feet above sea level.

Standard laboratory conditions
Because many definitions of standard temperature and pressure differ in temperature significantly from standard laboratory temperatures (e.g. 0 °C vs. ~25 °C), reference is often made to "standard laboratory conditions" (a term deliberately chosen to be different from the term "standard conditions for temperature and pressure", despite its semantic near identity when interpreted literally). However, what is a "standard" laboratory temperature and pressure is inevitably geography-bound, given that different parts of the world differ in climate, altitude and the degree of use of heat/cooling in the workplace. For example, schools in New South Wales, Australia use 25 °C at 100 kPa for standard laboratory conditions.
ASTM International has published Standard ASTM E41- Terminology Relating to Conditioning and hundreds of special conditions for particular materials and test methods. Other standards organizations also have specialized standard test conditions.

Molar volume of a gas
It is equally as important to indicate the applicable reference conditions of temperature and pressure when stating the molar volume of a gas as it is when expressing a gas volume or volumetric flow rate. Stating the molar volume of a gas without indicating the reference conditions of temperature and pressure has very little meaning and can cause confusion.

The molar volume of gases around STP and at atmospheric pressure can be calculated with an accuracy that is usually sufficient by using the ideal gas law. The molar volume of any ideal gas may be calculated at various standard reference conditions as shown below:
 Vm = 8.3145 × 273.15 / 101.325 = 22.414 dm3/mol at 0 °C and 101.325 kPa
 Vm = 8.3145 × 273.15 / 100.000 = 22.711 dm3/mol at 0 °C and 100 kPa
 Vm = 8.3145 × 288.15 / 101.325 = 23.645 dm3/mol at 15 °C and 101.325 kPa
 Vm = 8.3145 × 298.15 / 101.325 = 24.466 dm3/mol at 25 °C and 101.325 kPa
 Vm = 8.3145 × 298.15 / 100.000 = 24.790 dm3/mol at 25 °C and 100 kPa
 Vm = 10.7316 × 519.67 / 14.696 = 379.48 ft3/lbmol at 60 °F and 14.696 psi (or about 0.8366 ft3/gram mole)
 Vm = 10.7316 × 519.67 / 14.730 = 378.61 ft3/lbmol at 60 °F and 14.73 psi

Technical literature can be confusing because many authors fail to explain whether they are using the ideal gas constant R, or the specific gas constant Rs. The relationship between the two constants is Rs = R / m, where m is the molecular mass of the gas.

The US Standard Atmosphere (USSA) uses 8.31432 m3·Pa/(mol·K) as the value of R. However, the USSA,1976 does recognize that this value is not consistent with the values of the Avogadro constant and the Boltzmann constant.

See also
 Environmental chamber
 ISO 1 – standard reference temperature for geometric product specifications
 Reference atmospheric model
 Room temperature
 Standard sea-level conditions
 Standard state

Explanatory notes

References

External links
 "Standard conditions for gases" from the IUPAC Gold Book.
 "Standard pressure" from the IUPAC Gold Book.
 "STP" from the IUPAC Gold Book.
 "Standard state" from the IUPAC Gold Book.

Atmospheric thermodynamics
Aerodynamics
Engineering thermodynamics
Gases
Measurement
Physical chemistry
Standards
Thermodynamics